Luffenham Heath is an 18-hole golf course near South Luffenham in Rutland, England. Designed by Harry Colt, it began under the patronage of the Earl of Ancaster who had exchanged fields in South Luffenham for common land on the heath. 

The opening event in 1911, witnessed by over a thousand spectators, was an exhibition match between James Braid and Harry Vardon.

The club initially attracted an aristocratic membership. Viscount Castlereagh was club captain in 1912 and 1932, on the latter occasion bearing the title of Marquis of Londonderry.  In 1928, the Prince of Wales, who later became King Edward VIII, was invited to become captain. The club applied to be allowed to add the word Royal as a prefix to the club's name, but the request was refused.

Luffenham Heath Golf Course is a biological Site of Special Scientific Interest.

References

External links
Luffenham Heath website
Review of the course
Article in Rutland Living magazine; Nov 2010

Golf clubs and courses in Rutland
Sports venues in Rutland
Sites of Special Scientific Interest in Leicestershire
1911 establishments in England